Femi Babatunde Ijanikin (born December 13, 1986 in Ilorin) is a Nigerian football player currently playing with the Kwara United F.C. of Ilorin.

Career 
Babatunde hails from Ilorin of Ilorin-West local government area of Kwara State and is otherwise called “Biroro”. His only hobby is to play football.

He got into the senior team of Kwara United F.C. in 2005 from the club's youth side, and this makes for his debut in the Premier league.

References

1986 births
Living people
Nigerian footballers
Association football midfielders
Kwara United F.C. players
Yoruba sportspeople